Doriprismatica plumbea is a species of sea slug, a dorid nudibranch, a shell-less marine gastropod mollusk in the family Chromodorididae.

Distribution 
This species is found only in the Red Sea, and around Tanzania in the Western Indian Ocean.

References

Chromodorididae
Gastropods described in 1877